Didier René Henri Barbelivien (born 10 March 1954 in Paris) is a French author, lyricist, songwriter and singer. Beginning in the 1970s, he wrote a number of successful songs for artists such as: Dalida, Johnny Hallyday, Michel Sardou, Daniel Guichard, Claude François, Gilbert Montagné, Sylvie Vartan, Patti Layne, Gilbert Bécaud, Enrico Macias, Demis Roussos, Mireille Mathieu, Hervé Vilard, Michèle Torr, C. Jérôme, Christophe, Julio Iglesias, Sheila, Nicole Croisille, Patricia Kaas, Éric Charden, Jean-Pierre François, Michel Delpech, Philippe Lavil, Elsa, Gérard Lenorman, Ringo, Garou, Corynne Charby, David and Jonathan, and Caroline Legrand among others.

In the 1980s and 1990s, he enjoyed popular success singing his own songs, many of which climbed quickly to the top of the French charts of the era. In the 1990s, he sang several titles with Félix Gray.

He was made Chevalier (Knight) of the Légion d'honneur in 2009.

Discography

Albums
Solo
1980: Elle
1982: Elsa
1985: C'est de quel côté la mer?
1987: Peut-être toi, peut-être une autre1989: Des mots d'émotion1995: Que l'amour1997: Yesterday les Beatles2001: Chanteur français (FR #130)
2003: Léo2005: Envoie les clowns (FR #56)
2007: État des lieux: J'écrivais des chansons (FR #96)
2009: Atelier d'artistes (FR #8)
2011: Mes préférences (FR #4)
2013: Dédicacé (FR #27)
2016: Amours de moi (FR #84)

as Félix Gray and Didier Barbelivien
1991: Nos amours casséesas Anaïs et Didier Barbelivien
1992: Vendée 93 
1994: Quitter l'autoroute''

Singles
(selective)
as Félix Gray and Didier Barbelivien
1990: "À toutes les filles..." (FR #1)
1990: "Il faut laisser le temps au temps" (FR #1)
1991: "E vado via" (FR #5)
1991: "Nos amours cassées" (FR #20)
as Anaïs et Didier Barbelivien
1992: "Les Mariés de Vendée" (FR #2)
1993: "Quitter l'autoroute" (FR #32)
Solo
1993: "Puy du fou" (FR #39)

References

External links
http://www.discogs.com/artist/Didier+Barbelivien

1954 births
Living people
French songwriters
Male songwriters
Singers from Paris
Writers from Paris
Chevaliers of the Légion d'honneur
French male singers